McCann v United Kingdom [2008] ECHR 385 is a European Court of Human Rights case, concerning the right to a home. It was cited in Kušionová v SMART Capital a.s. by the European Court of Justice as being important for the interpretation of the Unfair Terms in Consumer Contracts Directive.

Facts

Judgment

See also

EU law
English contract law

Notes

References

European Court of Human Rights cases involving the United Kingdom
English contract case law
2008 in case law
2008 in British law